Toni Harper (June 8, 1937 – February 10, 2023), also known as Toni Dunlap, was an American former child singer who retired from performing at the age of 29.

After learning dance under Maceo Anderson, Harper was cast by the choreographer Nick Castle in Christmas Follies, at the Wilshire Ebell Theatre in 1945. She later went on to perform on stage with Herb Jeffries and Cab Calloway.

Harper performed at the third annual Cavalcade of Jazz concert held at Wrigley Field in Los Angeles produced by Leon Hefflin Sr. on September 7, 1947.  Woody Herman, The Valdez Orchestra, The Blenders, T-Bone Walker, Slim Gaillard, The Honeydrippers, Sarah Vaughan and the Three Blazers also performed that same day. She came back to perform for the  eighth Cavalcade of Jazz  concert on June 1, 1952. Also featured that day were Roy Brown and His Mighty Men, Anna Mae Winburn and Her Sweethearts, Jerry Wallace, Louis Jordan, Jimmy Witherspoon, and Josephine Baker.

Harper recorded "Candy Store Blues" in 1946, which became a platinum record, appeared twice on Toast of the Town (later The Ed Sullivan Show) in 1949, and made her third and final appearance on the show in 1950.

After success as a child singer, Harper recorded her first album, Toni, for Verve Records in 1955, with the Oscar Peterson trio. She made two further albums, arranged by Marty Paich, Lady Lonely (1959) and Night Mood (1960), for RCA Victor.
 
Harper toured Japan with Cannonball Adderley in 1963, and appeared in the film How to Stuff a Wild Bikini (1965), before retiring from performing in 1966.
Toni Harper died on February 10, 2023, near her home in Palm Springs, California.

Discography
 1956 Toni (with the Oscar Peterson trio)
 1957 Here Come The Girls! (with The Buddy Bregman Orchestra)
 1959 Lady Lonely (with Marty Paich & Orchestra)
 1960 Night Mood (with Marty Paich & Orchestra)
 1988 Candy Store Blues (compilation)

With Dizzy Gillespie
 Jazz Recital (Norgran, 1955)

With Harry James
"Baby Blues" and "Peculiar Kind Of Feeling" on Columbia 39390 (1951)
"Blacksmith Blues" and "Don't Send Me Home" on Columbia 39671 (1952)
"Melancholy Trumpet" on Columbia 39846 (1952)
"Fruit Cake" on Columbia 39877 (1952)

References

External links
 

1937 births
2023 deaths
African-American women singers
American jazz singers
American child singers
Columbia Records artists
American women jazz singers
Jubilee Records artists
RCA Records artists
Singers from Los Angeles
Torch singers
Traditional pop music singers
Verve Records artists
Jazz musicians from California